Anugarh Memorial Law College is one of the oldest law college of Bihar. It is situated beside Katari Hill Road, Ashok Nagar in Gaya in the Indian state of Bihar. It offers undergraduate 3 years LL.B. course which is approved by Bar Council of India (BCI), New Delhi and affiliated to Magadh University.

History
Anugarh Memorial Law College was established on 18 June 1964. This is named after nationalist politician and educationist Dr. Anugrah Narayan Sinha. It is one of the oldest law college of undivided Bihar.

References

Law schools in Bihar
Universities and colleges in Bihar
Colleges affiliated to Magadh University
Educational institutions established in 1964
1964 establishments in Bihar